Rúnar Alex Rúnarsson (born 18 February 1995) is an Icelandic professional footballer who plays as a goalkeeper for Süper Lig club Alanyaspor, on loan from Premier League side Arsenal, and the Iceland national team. He has also previously played for Dijon, Nordsjælland and KR Reykjavik.

Family
Rúnar Alex is the son of Rúnar Kristinsson, a former professional footballer.

Club career
Rúnar Alex was player of the season for FC Nordsjælland in the 2017–18 Danish Superliga.

In June 2018, Rúnar Alex joined Dijon on a four-year agreement.

Arsenal
On 21 September 2020, Rúnar Alex signed for Premier League club Arsenal on a four-year deal. He chose the number 13 at the club. Rúnar Alex made his debut for the club on the 29th October 2020, keeping a clean sheet in a 3–0 UEFA Europa League win over League of Ireland side Dundalk at the Emirates Stadium. After first choice goalkeeper Bernd Leno was sent off against Wolverhampton Wanderers on 2 February 2021, Rúnar Alex made his Premier League debut as a substitute for Thomas Partey in a 2–1 away defeat.

OH Leuven
On 31 August 2021, Rúnar Alex joined Belgian First Division A club OH Leuven on loan until the end of the season. On 27 October 2021, Rúnar Alex made his first appearance of the season for OH Leuven in their 2–1 Belgian Cup win over Lierse Kempenzonen, with his league debut coming one month later on 26 November 2021 in a 1–3 away win to league leaders Union SG.

Loan to Alanyaspor
On 15 August 2022, Arsenal announced that Rúnar Alex was loaned to Süper Lig side Alanyaspor.

International career
Having previously represented his country at youth level, Rúnar Alex was called up to the senior Iceland squad for the 2017 China Cup, where the team became the silver medalist He earned his first senior cap in a friendly against the Czech Republic on 9 November 2017.

In May 2018, he was named in Iceland's 23-man squad for the 2018 FIFA World Cup in Russia.

Career statistics

Club

International

References

External links

1995 births
Living people
Sportspeople from Reykjavík
Association football goalkeepers
Runar Alex Runarsson
Runar Alex Runarsson
Knattspyrnufélag Reykjavíkur players
FC Nordsjælland players
Dijon FCO players
Arsenal F.C. players
Oud-Heverlee Leuven players
Alanyaspor footballers
Danish Superliga players
Úrvalsdeild karla (football) players
Ligue 1 players
Belgian Pro League players
Süper Lig players
Iceland international footballers
Runar Alex Runarsson
2018 FIFA World Cup players
Expatriate men's footballers in Denmark
Expatriate footballers in France
Expatriate footballers in England
Expatriate footballers in Belgium
Icelandic expatriate sportspeople in Denmark
Icelandic expatriate sportspeople in France
Icelandic expatriate sportspeople in England
Icelandic expatriate sportspeople in Belgium
Premier League players